Roman Kornilov (born 30 March 1981) is a retired Kyrgyzstani international footballer who last played for Sher-Ak-Dan Bishkek, as a forward. Kornilov notably formerly played for SKA-Shoro Bishkek and Dordoi-Dynamo Naryn. He has made 20 appearances for the Kyrgyzstan national football team since 2003, scoring one goal.

International goals

References

External links

1981 births
Living people
Kyrgyzstani footballers
Kyrgyzstan international footballers
Kyrgyzstani people of Russian descent
FC Alga Bishkek players
FC Dinamo Bishkek players
FC Dordoi Bishkek players
Association football forwards
Kyrgyz Premier League players